FWL may refer to

 Far West Laboratory for Educational Research and Development
 Far West League (1948–1951), a defunct American Minor League baseball league
 Far West League (collegiate summer baseball league)
 Florida West International Airways, an American airline
 Frisch–Waugh–Lovell theorem
 West Leederville railway station, in Australia